Life Cycle is a studio album featuring solo cello performances by Dave Holland recorded in 1982 and released on the ECM label.

Reception
The Allmusic review by Brian Olewnick awarded the album 4 stars, stating, "Life Cycle is a very enchanting solo cello recital and, in Holland's case, a strong picture of a side of his musical genius that even many of his fans may well have overlooked. Recommended".

Track listing
All compositions by Dave Holland
 "Inception" - 4:17   
 "Discovery" - 4:27   
 "Longing" - 4:25   
 "Search" - 3:24   
 "Resolution" - 4:36   
 "Sonnet" - 2:22   
 "Rune" - 4:26   
 "Troubadour Tale' - 3:06   
 "Grapevine" - 3:29   
 "Morning Song" - 2:01   
 "Chanson Pour La Nuit" - 5:55  
Recorded at Tonstudio Bauer in Ludwigsburg, West Germany in November 1982

Personnel
David Holland — cello

References

External links

ECM Records albums
Dave Holland albums
1983 albums
Albums produced by Manfred Eicher